The 2011–12 FC Terek Grozny season was the fourth successive season that the club played in the Russian Premier League, the highest tier of football in Russia. They finished the season in 11th place, and reached the Quarter-Finals of the Russian Cup where they were eliminated by Volga Nizhny Novgorod after extra time.

Following the completion of the 2010 season, Anatoli Baidachny's contract as manager expired and he was replaced by Víctor Muñoz. However, after less than a month Muñoz left via mutual consent and was replaced by Ruud Gullit. Following only three wins in eleven games, Gullit was sacked on 14 June 2011, and replaced by Isa Baytiyev in a caretaker roll. On 27 September 2011 Baytiyev's caretaker spell came to an end and Stanislav Cherchesov was appointed as the club's manager.

Squad

Transfers

Winter 2010-11

In:

Out:

Summer 2011

In:

Out:

Winter 2011–12

In:

Out:

Released

Competitions

Russian Premier League

Matches

Table

Russian Premier League Relegation Group

Matches

Table

Russian Cup

Squad statistics

Appearances and goals

|-
|colspan="14"|Players away from Terek Grozny on loan:
|-
|colspan="14"|Players who appeared for Terek Grozny and left during the season:

|}

Goal Scorers

Disciplinary record

References

FC Akhmat Grozny seasons
Terek Grozny